John Forbes (British Army officer) (1707–1759) was a British Army brigadier general. General Forbes may also refer to:

David Forbes (British Army officer) (1772–1849), British Army major general
Edwin Alexander Forbes (1860–1915), California National Guard brigadier general
George Forbes, 4th Earl of Granard (1710–1769), British Army lieutenant general
George Forbes, 6th Earl of Granard (1760–1837), British Army lieutenant general
Gordon Forbes (British Army officer) (1738–1828), British Army general
James Forbes, 17th Lord Forbes (1765–1843), British Army general
Robert C. Forbes (1917–2002), U.S. Army major general

See also
James Forbes-Robertson (1884–1955), British Army temporary brigadier general